Juan Pablo Hourquebie (born May 3, 1976 in Quilmes, Buenos Aires Province) is a field hockey defender from Argentina, who is nicknamed Juanpi. He is a member of the national squad since 1997, and competed in two Summer Olympics, starting in 2000. Hourquebie was on the side that won the golden medal at the 2003 Pan American Games in Santo Domingo, and won the 2005 Champions Challenge tournament in Alexandria, Egypt.

External links

 Profile on Athens 2004-website

People from Quilmes
1976 births
Living people
Argentine male field hockey players
Male field hockey defenders
Olympic field hockey players of Argentina
Field hockey players at the 2000 Summer Olympics
2002 Men's Hockey World Cup players
Field hockey players at the 2004 Summer Olympics
2006 Men's Hockey World Cup players
Pan American Games gold medalists for Argentina
Pan American Games medalists in field hockey
Field hockey players at the 2003 Pan American Games
Medalists at the 2003 Pan American Games
Sportspeople from Buenos Aires Province